"Simmer" is the debut solo single by American singer-songwriter and Paramore front-woman Hayley Williams. It was released for digital download and to streaming platforms on January 22, 2020 by Atlantic Records, as the lead single from Williams' debut album Petals for Armor. The song was written by Williams, Paramore touring musician Joseph Howard, and guitarist Taylor York.

Background
In December 2019, Williams announced on her birthday that she would be releasing a "taste" of new solo music in January 2020. Williams revealed the song title on social media on January 20, 2020, after posting various teasers over the course of January which featured a "dark aesthetic", with one including a person running through the woods.

Composition
"Simmer" has been labeled as indie pop, dark pop, and alternative rock. The track runs at 110 BPM and is in the key of A minor. It runs at four minutes and 26 seconds. The song was written by Hayley Williams, Taylor York, and Joseph Howard, with York also handling production.

Lyrics
Hayley Williams wrote "Simmer" about her personal experiences with specific types of abuse  she has dealt with in her life. In an interview with Apple Music, Williams described how "Simmer" lyrically may not pertain to everyone and is specific about her personal experiences: "I can't promise this song will relate to everyone [...] It is about specific kinds of abuse and revenge, not everyone is going to want to associate with that. What I'm trying to do–for myself more than anyone else–is reframe my anger and try to learn from it. Instead of pretending it isn't there, ask it what it wants. The answer is almost never what you think it's going to be." She continued, "There is still a lot more to share [on Petals for Armor].

Reception
Cat Zhang from Pitchfork said: "The first word of Williams' new debut solo single, 'Simmer,' is an enunciated 'rage'. It hangs in the air like a provocation before she finishes: '... is a quiet thing'", also noticing the lack of "distorted, thrashing guitar[s]"; instead, saying it is accented by watery harp and ominous vocal harmonies. She also added: "Like a soundtrack song, 'Simmer' sets a mood and asks some hazy rhetorical questions—but too often, this story feels as though it could be passed off to anybody".

Vulture's Jordan Crucchiola considered the "Simmer" music video as a "mini horror movie", saying: "The whole thing is also pretty good set up for a cabin-in-the-woods horror movie".

Music video
The music video for "Simmer" was released on January 22, at the same time as the song. It was directed by Warren Fu.

The music video depicts Williams running naked through a forest at night, seemingly being chased by an unknown figure. She enters a house and discovers a room filled with candles and a bowl containing clay, which she covers her body with. When the figure eventually arrives at the room, Williams hits them with the bowl, knocking them unconscious. This results in the figure's mask coming off, revealing them to be Williams herself.

As of February 2021, the song has 6 million views on YouTube.

Personnel
Credits adapted from Tidal liner notes.

 Hayley Williams – primary artist, vocals, keyboards, guitar
 Taylor York – producer, additional instrumentation
 Joey Howard – bass, keyboards
 Aaron Steele – drums, programming
 Carlos de la Garza – mixer, engineer
 Dave Cooley – mastering engineer
 Kevin "K-Bo" Boettger – assistant engineer
 Michael Craver – assistant engineer, assistant mixer
 David Fitzgibbons – assistant engineer, assistant mixer
 Michelle Freetly – assistant engineer
 Jake Butler – assistant engineer

Charts

Weekly charts

Year-end charts

Release history

References

2020 singles
2020 songs
2020 debut singles
Atlantic Records singles
Songs written by Hayley Williams
Songs written by Taylor York
Hayley Williams songs
Music videos directed by Warren Fu